In the Soviet Union, a systematic political abuse of psychiatry took place and was based on the interpretation of political dissent as a psychiatric problem. It was called "psychopathological mechanisms" of dissent.

During the leadership of General Secretary Leonid Brezhnev, psychiatry was used as a tool to eliminate political opponents ("dissidents") who openly expressed beliefs that contradicted official dogma. The term "philosophical intoxication" was widely used to diagnose mental disorders in cases where people disagreed with leaders and made them the target of criticism that used the writings by Karl Marx, Friedrich Engels, and Vladimir Lenin. Article 58-10 of the Stalin Criminal Code—which as Article 70 had been shifted into the RSFSR Criminal Code of 1962—and Article 190-1 of the RSFSR Criminal Code along with the system of diagnosing mental illness, developed by academician Andrei Snezhnevsky, created the very preconditions under which non-standard beliefs could easily be transformed into a criminal case, and it, in its turn, into a psychiatric diagnosis. Anti-Soviet political behavior, in particular, being outspoken in opposition to the authorities, demonstrating for reform, writing books were defined in some persons as being simultaneously a criminal act (e.g., violation of Articles 70 or 190–1), a symptom (e.g., "delusion of reformism"), and a diagnosis (e.g., "sluggish schizophrenia"). Within the boundaries of the diagnostic category, the symptoms of pessimism, poor social adaptation and conflict with authorities were themselves sufficient for a formal diagnosis of "sluggish schizophrenia."

The process of psychiatric incarceration was instigated by attempts to emigrate; distribution or possession of prohibited documents or books; participation in civil rights actions and demonstrations, and involvement in forbidden religious activity. The religious faith of prisoners, including  well-educated former atheists who adopted a religion, was determined to be a form of mental illness that needed to be cured. The KGB routinely sent dissenters to psychiatrists for diagnosing to avoid embarrassing public trials and to discredit dissidence as the product of ill minds. Formerly highly classified government documents published after the dissolution of the Soviet Union demonstrate that the authorities used psychiatry as a tool to suppress dissent.

According to the Commentary on the Russian Federation Law on Psychiatric Care, persons who were subjected to repressions in the form of commitment for compulsory treatment to psychiatric medical institutions and were rehabilitated in accordance with the established procedure receive compensation. The Russian Federation acknowledged that psychiatry was used for political purposes and took responsibility for the victims of "political psychiatry."

Political abuse of psychiatry in Russia continues after the fall of the Soviet Union and threatens human rights activists with a psychiatric diagnosis.

Background 

Political abuse of psychiatry is the misuse of psychiatric diagnosis, detention and treatment for the purposes of obstructing the fundamental human rights of certain groups and individuals in a society. It entails the exculpation and committal of citizens to psychiatric facilities based upon political rather than mental health-based criteria. Many authors, including psychiatrists, also use the terms "Soviet political psychiatry" or "punitive psychiatry" to refer to this phenomenon.

In the book Punitive Medicine by Alexander Podrabinek, the term "punitive medicine", which is identified with "punitive psychiatry," is defined as "a tool in the struggle against dissidents who cannot be punished by legal means." Punitive psychiatry is neither a discrete subject nor a psychiatric specialty but, rather, it is an emergency arising within many applied sciences in totalitarian countries where members of a profession may feel themselves compelled to service the diktats of power. Psychiatric confinement of sane people is uniformly considered a particularly pernicious form of repression and Soviet punitive psychiatry was one of the key weapons of both illegal and legal repression.

As Vladimir Bukovsky and Semyon Gluzman wrote in their joint A Manual on Psychiatry for Dissenters, "the Soviet use of psychiatry as a punitive means is based upon the deliberate interpretation of dissent… as a psychiatric problem." This work was published in Russian, English, French, Italian, German, Danish.

Psychiatry possesses an inherent capacity for abuse that is greater than in other areas of medicine. The diagnosis of mental disease can give the state license to detain persons against their will and insist upon therapy both in the interest of the detainee and in the broader interests of society. In addition, receiving a psychiatric diagnosis can in itself be regarded as oppressive. In a monolithic state, psychiatry can be used to bypass standard legal procedures for establishing guilt or innocence and allow political incarceration without the ordinary odium attaching to such political trials. In the period from the 1960s to 1986, the abuse of psychiatry for political purposes was reported to have been systematic in the Soviet Union and episodic in other Eastern European countries such as Romania, Hungary, Czechoslovakia, and Yugoslavia. The practice of incarceration of political dissidents in mental hospitals in Eastern Europe and the former USSR damaged the credibility of psychiatric practice in these states and entailed strong condemnation from the international community. Psychiatrists have been involved in human rights abuses in states across the world when the definitions of mental disease were expanded to include political disobedience. As scholars have long argued, governmental and medical institutions have at times coded threats to authority as mental disease during periods of political disturbance and instability. Nowadays, in many countries, political prisoners are still sometimes confined and abused in mental institutions.

In the Soviet Union dissidents were often confined in the so-called psikhushka, or psychiatric wards. Psikhushka is the Russian ironic diminutive for "mental hospital". One of the first psikhushkas was the Psychiatric Prison Hospital in the city of Kazan. In 1939 it was transferred to the control of the NKVD, the secret police and the precursor organization to the KGB, under the order of Lavrentiy Beria, who was the head of the NKVD. International human rights defenders such as Walter Reich have long recorded the methods by which Soviet psychiatrists in Psikhushka hospitals diagnosed schizophrenia in political dissenters. Western scholars examined no aspect of Soviet psychiatry as thoroughly as its involvement in the social control of political dissenters.

Individual cases

Sergei Pisarev 
Cases of political abuse of psychiatry have been known since the 1940s and 1950s. One of these early cases was that of party official Sergei Pisarev. Pisarev was arrested after criticizing the work of the Soviet secret police in the context of the so-called Doctors' Plot, an anti-Semitic campaign waged at Stalin's instructions that should have brought about a new terror wave in the Soviet Union and possibly the extermination of the remaining Jewish communes that had outlived the Second World War. Pisarev was committed to the Special Psychiatric Hospital in Leningrad which along with an analogous hospital in Sychevka has started functioning since the Second World War. After his discharge, Pisarev began a campaign against political abuse of psychiatry, concentrating on the Serbsky Institute which he viewed to be the seat of the trouble. As a consequence of his efforts, the Central Committee of the Communist Party formed a committee which investigated the situation and came to the conclusion that political abuse of psychiatry was actually taking place. The report, however, vanished in a desk drawer and never brought about any action.

Pyotr Grigorenko 

In 1961, Soviet general Pyotr Grigorenko started to openly criticize what he considered the excesses of the Khrushchev regime. He maintained that the special privileges of the political elite did not comply with the principles laid down by Lenin. Grigorenko formed a dissident group — The Group for the Struggle to Revive Leninism. Soviet psychiatrists from commissions instituted to inquire into his sanity diagnosed him at least three times — in April 1964, August 1969, and November 1969. When arrested, Grigorenko was sent to Moscow's Lubyanka prison, and from there for psychiatric examination to the Serbsky Institute where the first commission, which included Snezhnevsky and Lunts, diagnosed him with the mental disease in the form of a paranoid delusional development of his personality, accompanied by early signs of cerebral arteriosclerosis. Lunts, reporting later on this diagnosis, mentioned that the symptoms of paranoid development were "an overestimation of his own personality reaching messianic proportions" and "reformist ideas." Grigorenko was irresponsible for his actions and was thereby forcibly committed to a special psychiatric hospital. While there, the government deprived him of his pension despite the fact that, by law, a mentally sick military officer was entitled to a pension. After six months, Grigorenko was found to be in remission and was released for outpatient follow-up. He required that his pension be restored. Although he began to draw pension again, it was severely cut. He became much more active in his dissidence, stirred other people to protest some of the State's actions and received several warnings from the KGB. As Grigorenko had followers in Moscow, he was lured to Tashkent, half a continent away. Again he was arrested and examined by psychiatric team. None of the manifestations or symptoms cited by the Lunts commission were found by the second commission held in Tashkent under the chairmanship of Fyodor Detengof. The diagnosis and evaluation made by the commission was that "Grigorenko's [criminal] activity had a purposeful character, it was related to concrete events and facts... It did not reveal any signs of illness or delusions." The psychiatrists reported that he was not mentally sick, but responsible for his actions. He had firm convictions which were shared by many of his colleagues and were not delusional. Having evaluated the records of his preceding hospitalization, they concluded that he had not been sick at that time either. The KGB brought Grigorenko back in Moscow and, three months later, arranged a second examination at the Serbsky Institute. Once again, these psychiatrists found that he had "a paranoid development of the personality" manifested by reformist ideas. The commission, which included Lunts and was chaired by Morozov, recommended that he be recommitted to a special psychiatric hospital for the socially dangerous. Eventually, after almost four years, he was transferred to a usual mental hospital.

In 1971, Dr. Semyon Gluzman wrote a psychiatric report on Grigorenko. Gluzman came to the conclusion that Grigorenko was mentally sane and had been taken to mental hospitals for political reasons. In the late 1970s and early 1980s, Gluzman was forced to serve seven years in labor camp and three years in Siberian exile for refusing to diagnose Grigorenko with a mental illness.

Andrew, Grigorenko's son, was declared a hereditary madman in 1975 and was expelled from the USSR to the USA where he lives now. Andrew was repeatedly told that since his father was mentally ill, then he was hereditarily mentally ill as well, and if he would not stop his appearances in defense of human rights and his father, he was told to go to psikhushka.

In 1979 in New York, Grigorenko was examined by the team of psychologists and psychiatrists including Alan A. Stone, the then President of American Psychiatric Association. The team came to the conclusion that they could find no evidence of mental disease in Grigorenko and his history consistent with mental disease in the past. The conclusion was drawn up by Walter Reich. Stone said Grigorenko's case confirms some of the accusations that psychiatry in the Soviet Union is sometimes employed as a tool of political repression. In 1981, Pyotr Grigorenko told about his psychiatric examinations and hospitalizations in his memoirs V Podpolye Mozhno Vstretit Tolko Krys (In The Underground One Can Meet Only Rats) translated into English under the title Memoirs in 1982. In 1991, a commission, composed of psychiatrists from all over the Soviet Union and led by Modest Kabanov, director of the Bekhterev Psychoneurological Institute in St Petersburg, spent six months reviewing the Grigorenko files, drew up 29 thick volumes of legal proceedings, and reversed the official diagnosis on Grigorenko in October 1991. In 1992, the official post-mortem forensic psychiatric commission of experts met at Grigorenko's homeland removed the stigma of mental patient from him and confirmed that the debilitating treatment he underwent in high security psychiatric hospitals for many years was groundless. The 1992 psychiatric examination of Grigorenko was described by the Nezavisimiy Psikhiatricheskiy Zhurnal in its numbers 1–4 of 1992.

Viktor Rafalsky 
Viktor Rafalsky, a political prisoner, dissident and author of unpublished plays, novels, and short stories, was committed to Soviet psychiatric prisons in Lviv, Dnipropetrovsk, and Leningrad for 24 years because of belonging to a clandestine Marxist group (from 1954 to 1959), writing anti-Soviet prose (from 1962 to 1965), and possessing anti-Soviet literature (from 1968 to 1983). In the winter of 1987, he was discharged and pronounced sane. In 1988, Viktor Rafalsky published the first version of his memoirs Reportazh iz Niotkuda (Reportage from Nowhere) describing his confinement in Soviet psychiatric hospitals. In his memoirs, he writes, "I will say plain: when I got into a prison (it happened quite often), I, whether you believe or not, had a rest. So what was a prison in comparison with the horror of prison psikhushkas?!" Some pages below, he adds, "In a prison, you can read, write, lastly do something to kill time. In prison psikhushkas, you have the right only to look at the ceiling: it is forbidden to keep paper, pencils, and even a book."

Joseph Brodsky 

At the very end of 1963, the poet Joseph Brodsky was committed for observation to the Kashchenko psychiatric clinic in Moscow where he stayed for several days. A few weeks later, his second hospitalization took place: on 13 February he was arrested in Leningrad. Brought to trial for "pursuing a parasitic way of life", Brodsky was accused of being a poet and of not doing more "productive" work. There were two hearings of the trial dated 18 February and 13 March 1964. The judge ordered to send him "for an official psychiatric examination during which it will be determined whether Brodsky is suffering from some sort of psychological illness or not and whether this illness will prevent Brodsky from being sent to a distant locality for forced labor. Taking into consideration that from the history of his illness it is apparent that Brodsky has evaded hospitalization, it is hereby ordered that division No. 18 of the militia be in charge of bringing him to the official psychiatric examination." On 18 February, the Dzerzhinsky District Court sent Brodsky for psychiatric examination to "Pryazhka," Psychiatric Hospital No. 2 where he spent about three weeks, from 18 February to 13 March. In the mental hospitals, Brodsky was given "tranquilizing" injections, wakened in the middle of the night, immersed into a cold bath, wrapped in a wet sheet, and put next to the heater so that the sheet would cut into his body when it dried. These two stints at psychiatric establishments formed the experience underlying Gorbunov and Gorchakov written and called by Brodsky "an extremely serious work." In 1972, when the authorities considered Brodsky for exile and sought an expert opinion on his mental health, they consulted Snezhnevsky who, without examining him personally, diagnosed him with schizophrenia and concluded that he was "not a valuable person at all and may be let go."

Valery Tarsis 

In 1965 in the West, strong public awareness that Soviet psychiatry could be subject to political abuse arose with publication of the book Ward 7 by Valery Tarsis, a writer born in 1906 in Kiev. He based the book upon his own experiences in 1963–1964 when he was detained in the Moscow Kashchenko psychiatric hospital for political reasons.

The fictionalised documentary Ward No. 7 by Tarsis was the first literary work to deal with the Soviet authorities' abuse of psychiatry. In a parallel with the story Ward No. 6 by Anton Chekhov, Tarsis implies that it is the doctors who are mad, whereas the patients are completely sane, although unsuited to a life of slavery. Individuals in ward No. 7 are not cured, but persistently maimed; the hospital is a jail and the doctors are gaolers and police spies. Most doctors know nothing about psychiatry, but make diagnoses arbitrarily and give all patients the same medication — an algogenic injection or the anti-psychotic drug Aminazin known in the USA under trade name Thorazine. Tarsis denounces Soviet psychiatry as pseudo-science and charlatanism and writes that, firstly, it has pretenses of curing the sickness of men's souls, but denies the existence of the soul; secondly, since there is no satisfactory definition of mental health, there can be no acceptable definition of mental disease in Soviet society.

In 1966, Tarsis was permitted to emigrate to the West, and was soon deprived of his Soviet citizenship. The KGB had plans to compromise the literary career of Tarsis abroad through labelling him as a mentally ill person. As the 1966 memorandum to the Politburo of the Central Committee of the Communist Party of the Soviet Union reported, "KGB continues arrangements for further compromising Tarsis abroad as a mentally ill person." Among all the victims of Soviet psychiatry, Tarsis was the sole exception in the sense that he did not emphasize the 'injustice' of confining 'sane dissidents' to psychiatric hospitals and did not thereby imply that the psychiatric confinement of 'insane patients' was proper and just.

Evgeni Belov 
Shortly after publishing Ward 7, a second case of political abuse of psychiatry gave rise to attention in Great Britain. Evgeni Belov, a young Moscow interpreter contracted by a group of four British students, made friends with them. At first he was positive about Soviet system, but gradually became more critical and began to voice demand for more freedom. Calling for a free press and free trade unions, Belov began to write letters to the Party. As a consequence, his membership in the Party was suspended and he was summoned to appear before a committee. He declined, and instead sought justice higher up by writing protest letters to Leonid Brezhnev himself. When British students returned from a short trip to Tokyo, Belov had vanished. To their shock, it emerged that he had been committed to a mental hospital. A campaign to get him out yielded no results. A British newspaper published a letter in which Belov's father stated that his son was really sick, and the campaign came to a grinding halt. However, the public interest had been activated.

Alexander Esenin-Volpin 

Awareness in the West was also raised by the case of Alexander Esenin-Volpin, a son of the famous Russian poet Sergei Esenin and born in 1924. In 1946, he was first committed to the Leningrad Special Psychiatric Hospital for writing a poem considered anti-Soviet. During Khrushchev's reign, Esenin-Volpin was later hospitalized three times: in 1957, in 1959–1960 in the same the Leningrad Special Psychiatric Hospital and, finally, in 1962–1963. In 1968, Esenin-Volpin was again hospitalized, and for this once his case achieved the attention in the West. In February 1968, 99 Soviet mathematicians and scientists signed a protest letter to the Soviet officials demanding his release. After a wave of protests, he was discharged and permitted to immigrate to the USA where he obtained the position of professor of mathematics. In 2010, Alexander Magalif, who hospitalized Esenin-Volpin, recollected that he had seen a little mark made by a pencil in the corner of the referral to treatment of Esenin-Volpin: "not to discharge from the hospital without coordination with KGB."

Yuli Daniel 
In 1965, the writer Yuli Daniel was arrested due to his satirical anti-Stalinist works and outspoken protest at the human rights abuse in the USSR. Daniel was kept in a mental hospital of the Gulag where he was refused medical treatment in order to destroy his will.

Viktor Fainberg 

Viktor Fainberg was one of the seven participants of the 1968 Red Square demonstration against the Soviet intervention into Czechoslovakia. He was committed for compulsory treatment to the Special Psychiatric Hospital in Leningrad where he was confined for five years. During his confinement, a psychiatrist working in the establishment, Marina Voikhanskaya, fell in love with him and helped him as much as she could. After his discharge, they married and emigrated to the United Kingdom where Fainberg organized the Campaign Against Psychiatric Abuse and was its director. When Fainberg and Voikhanskaya had divorced, Viktor moved to Paris and Marina remained in the United Kingdom.

Valeriya Novodvorskaya 

In 1968, Valeriya Novodvorskaya created an underground student organization whose purpose was to overthrow the Soviet state. On 5 December 1969, she was arrested in the Kremlin Palace of Congresses, where before the start of a performance of the opera October she was handing out and scattering leaflets written in verse form until she was approached by KGB men. She was later sentenced to indefinite detention in the prison psychiatric hospital in Kazan. Her experience in this hospital was described in her largest collection of writings entitled Po Tu Storonu Otchayaniya (Beyond Despair). Novodvorskaya was also committed in a mental hospital later, in 1978 as a member of the Free Interprofessional Association of Workers and as a person arrested "for insulting President" in September 1990; that time she was discharged after the 1991 putsch. In the early 1990s, psychiatrists of the Independent Psychiatric Association of Russia and G. N. Sotsevich proved the absence of mental illness in Novodvorskaya.

Natalya Gorbanevskaya 

After the 1968 Red Square demonstration against the Soviet invasion into Czechoslovakia, August 1968 saw the arrest of Natalya Gorbanevskaya well known in the West due to her book Red Square at Noon describing the demonstration. A few days later, the Serbsky Institute found her non-accountable and made diagnosis of "deep psychopathy—the presence of mild, chronic schizophrenic process cannot be excluded." She was allowed to return to the care of her mother. In November 1969, a psychiatric commission again examined her, diagnosed "psychopathic personality with symptoms of hysteria and a tendency to decompensation", but considered that psychiatric hospitalization was not required. A month later, she was again arrested and sent to the Serbsky Institute for psychiatric examination in April 1970. The investigating commission chaired by Morozov found her non-responsible and that she had a "chronic, mental illness in the form of schizophrenia." The commission found in her the presence of changes in the thinking processes and in the critical and emotional faculties characteristic of schizophrenia. It was concluded that Gorbanevskaya took part in the Red Square demonstration in a state of the mental disease. In Paris, French psychiatrists at their request examined Gorbanevskaya and found her to be mentally normal. They concluded that in 1969–1972 she had been committed to a psychiatric hospital for political, not medical reasons.

Zhores Medvedev 
On 29 May 1970, Zhores Medvedev, an internationally respected and prominent scientist, was forcibly taken from his apartment in Obninsk and committed to a mental hospital where he was held, without legitimate medical justification, until 17 June 1970. The leadership was instantly faced with the action of strong collective protest initiated by top Soviet scientists including Igor Tamm and Pyotr Kapitsa. Medvedev's release was achieved only after intense pressure from intellectuals and scientists both within and outside of the USSR. He was largely hospitalized because of the publication abroad of his book of Trofim Lysenko. In widely circulated books, Zhores Medvedev had criticized the "geneticist" Lysenko and had also expressed his straightforward disagreement with restrictions on communication with scientists abroad. He was removed from his position as head of a laboratory at the Institute of Medical Radiology and this removal was illegal, he said. The diagnosis in the case-notes was "incipient schizophrenia," the diagnosis made by the psychiatric commission was "psychopathic personality with paranoid tendencies." What happened to Medvedev was not a separate incident; rather, it was part, in Medvedev's words, of "the dangerous tendency of using psychiatry for political purposes, the exploitation of medicine in an alien role as a means of intimidation and punishment — a new and illegal way of isolating people for their views and convictions." This experience was reflected in Zhores Medvedev's and Roy Medvedev's book A Question of Madness: Repression by Psychiatry in the Soviet Union published by Macmillan in London in 1971.

Andrei Sakharov 

In 1971, renowned Soviet physicist Andrei Sakharov supported a protest of two political prisoners, V. Fainberg and V. Borisov, who announced a hunger strike against "compulsory therapeutic treatment with medications injurious to mental activity" in a Leningrad psychiatric institution. In 1984, after publishing an article by Andrei Sakharov in the United States urging a buildup of nuclear weapons in the West, Soviet officials declared him "a talented, but sick man." When sent into internal exile to Gorky "for his own peace of mind," according to officials, "Soviet medics are taking all necessary measures to restore his health." One day in a selected auditorium, when discussing the situation in the country, Snezhnevsky, in the words of some of his clinical staff, diagnosed Sakharov with sluggish schizophrenia in absentia. The director of KGB political police department (Fifth Directorate) Philipp Bobkov concluded, "Sakharov is objectively a mentally ill person. The complication with regards to operational consequences lies in the fact that for political reasons he cannot be committed to a psychiatric hospital." Soviet authorities compulsorily committed Sakharov to a closed ward of the Semashko Hospital in Gorky, where he was force-fed and given drugs to change the state of his mind.

Viktor Nekipelov 
Viktor Nekipelov, a well-known dissident poet, was arrested in 1973, sent to the Section 4 of the Serbsky Institute of Forensic Psychiatry for psychiatric evaluation, which lasted from 15 January to 12 March 1974, was judged sane (which he was), tried, and sentenced to two years' imprisonment. In 1976, he published in samizdat his book Institute of Fools: Notes on the Serbsky Institute based on his personal experience at Psychiatric Hospital of the Serbsky Institute and translated into English in 1980. In this account, he wrote compassionately, engagingly, and observantly of the doctors and other patients; most of the latters were ordinary criminals feigning insanity in order to be sent to a mental hospital, because hospital was a "cushy number" as against prison camps. According to the President of the Independent Psychiatric Association of Russia Yuri Savenko, Nekipelov's book is a highly dramatic humane document, a fair story about the nest of Soviet punitive psychiatry, a mirror that psychiatrists always need to look into. However, according to Malcolm Lader, this book as an indictment of the Serbsky Institute hardly rises above tittle-tattle and gossip, and Nekipelov destroys his own credibility by presenting no real evidence but invariably putting the most sinister connotation on events. After publishing his book, he was sentenced to the maximum punishment for "anti-Soviet agitation and propaganda" of seven years in a labor camp and then five years in internal exile.

Political abuse of groups

AGDHR members 
In 1968, the human rights movement in the USSR focused directly on Soviet political psychiatry, organizing public protests and writing international bodies. In 1969, a group of about 14 activists including Sergei Kovalyov, a future Russian human rights ombudsman, constituted the Action Group for the Defense of Human Rights in the USSR. The group composed the first samizdat (self-published) human rights bulletin, A Chronicle of Current Events. Among the members of the Action Group were individuals who subsequently fell victim to psychiatric abuse themselves: the poet Natalya Gorbanevskaya who in 1968 demonstrated on Red Square against bringing Soviet tanks into Czechoslovakia; Vladimir Borisov who later was one of the founders of the independent labor movement in the Soviet Union; Vladimir Maltsev, a translator; and Leonid Plyushch, a Ukrainian cyberneticist who was committed to the Special Psychiatric Hospital of Dnepropetrovsk and was awfully tortured with neuroleptics. Later three senior Fellows of the Royal College of Psychiatrists examined Leonid Plyushch and "saw no indication of schizophrenia or other mental illness."

AFTU members 
In November 1977, a group of unemployed and workers led by Vladimir Klebanov, a former coalminer from the Donbas region of the Ukraine, announced the formation in the Soviet Union of the Association of Free Trade Unions of Workers (AFTU) whose purposes were to meet obligations achieved by collective bargaining; to induce workers and other employees to join free trade union associations; to implement those decisions of the Association which concern the seeking of justice and the defense of rights; to educate Association members in the spirit of irreconcilability toward wastefulness, inefficiency, deception, bureaucracy, deficiencies, and a negligent attitude toward national wealth. These purposes show that AFTU was in all respects an organization whose right to exist is guaranteed by the international obligations of the Soviet Union. On 19 December 1977, Klebanov along with two other workers in Donetsk was arrested by the Soviet militia and released nine days later, after international protests against his incarceration. Worker Gavriil Yankov was incarcerated in Moscow mental hospital for two weeks. On 1 February 1978, AFTU publicly announced the institution of its organizational Charter. Several days later, Klebanov was again detained by Soviet police and sent from Moscow to psychiatric prison hospital in Donetsk. Group member Nikolaev and workers Pelekh and Dvoretsky were also placed under psychiatric detention.

SMOT members 
By October 1978 it was apparent that arrests and repressions had resulted in the dissolution of AFTU. But the cause of trade union rights was to be invigorated by a new group, the Free Interprofessional Association of Workers known by its Russian acronym, SMOT, whose first press conference was held in Moscow on 28 October 1978. The objectives of SMOT were to defend its members in cases of violation of their rights in different spheres of their daily activities: political, domestic, religious, spiritual, cultural, social, and economic; to look into the legal basis of the workers' complaints; to ensure that these complains were brought to the notice of relevant organizations; to facilitate a quick solution to complaints of workers; and in cases of negative results, to publicize them widely before international and Soviet public. The leadership of SMOT was headed by a native of Leningrad electrician Vladimir Borisov incarcerated in Soviet mental hospitals because of his human rights activism for a total of nine years in the 1960s and 1970s. In November and December 1978, Soviet police searched the homes of SMOT activists, and SMOT members Vladimir Borisov, Valeriya Novodvorskaya, Albina Yakoreva, and Lev Volokhonsky were arrested and detained by Soviet authorities. Both Borisov and Novodvorskaya were held in mental hospitals.

See also 
 The Protest Psychosis: How Schizophrenia Became a Black Disease

References

Sources 

Archival sources
 
 
 

Government publications and official reports
 
 
 
 
 
 
 
 
 
 
 

Books
 
 
 
 
 
 
 
 
 
 
 
 
 
 
 
 
 
 
 
 
 
 
 
 
 
 
 
 
 
 
 
 
 
 
 
 
 
 
 
 
 
 
 
 
 
 
 
 
 
 
 
 
 
 
 
 
 
 
 
 
 
 
  Russian text: 
 
 
 
 
 
 

Journal articles and book chapters
 
 
 
 
 
  
 
 
 
 
 
 
 
 
 
 
 
 
 
 
 
 
 
 
 
 
 
 
 
 
 
 
 
 
 
 
 
 
 
 
 
  Russian text: 
 
 
 
 
 
 
 
 
 
 
 
 
 
 
 
 
 
 
 

Newspapers
 
 
 
 
 
 
 

Websites

Further reading 
 
   (The Russian text of the book )
 
 
 
 
 
 
 
 
  Russian text: 
 
 
 
 

Political abuse of psychiatry in the Soviet Union
Political repression in the Soviet Union
Persecution of dissidents in the Soviet Union
Mental health in the Soviet Union
Unnecessary health care
Human rights in the Soviet Union
Human rights abuses in the Soviet Union
Human rights abuses in Russia
Human rights organizations based in Russia
Moscow Helsinki Group
Control (social and political)
Ethics in psychiatry
Soviet law
Cold War history of the Soviet Union
Era of Stagnation